The 2009 Japanese Formula 3 Championship was the 31st edition of the Japanese Formula 3 Championship. It commenced on April 4, 2009 and ended on September 27.

Marcus Ericsson became the first Swedish champion, after a title battle which went down to the final round in Sportsland SUGO. Ericsson won with 112 points, beating his teammates Takuto Iguchi with 103 points, and Yuji Kunimoto with 97 points.

Teams and drivers
All teams were Japanese-registered.

Notes

Race calendar and results

Standings

Championship Class
Points are awarded as follows:

Teams Standings
Points are awarded for both races as follows:

Engine Tuners Standings
Points are awarded for both races as follows:

National Class

Teams Standings
Points are awarded for both races as follows:

References

External links
 Official Site 

Formula Three
Japanese Formula 3 Championship seasons
Japan
Japanese Formula 3